Miracema do Tocantins (Akwẽ-Xerénte Krikahâ dawanã hã ) is a municipality of the Brazilian state of Tocantins. Its estimated population in 2020 was 17,936 inhabitants.

It was the state capital until 1990.

References

Municipalities in Tocantins